Tecoma beckii is a species of flowering plants native to Bolivia. Unlike some other Tecoma species, the leaves are simple.

References

beckii
Flora of South America